The keel-billed toucan (Ramphastos sulfuratus), also known as sulfur-breasted toucan, keel toucan, or rainbow-billed toucan, is a colorful Latin American member of the toucan family. It is the national bird of Belize. The species is found in tropical jungles from southern Mexico to Colombia. It is an omnivorous forest bird that feeds on fruits, seeds, insects, invertebrates, lizards, snakes, and small birds and their eggs.

Taxonomy and systematics

Subspecies
Two subspecies are recognized:
 R. s. sulfuratus – Lesson, 1830: Found in south-eastern Mexico, Belize and northern Guatemala
 R. s. brevicarinatus – Gould, 1854: Originally described as a separate species. Found in south-eastern Guatemala to northern Colombia and north-western Venezuela

Description

While the bill seems large and cumbersome, it is in fact a spongy, hollow bone covered in keratin, a very light and hard protein.

The plumage of the keel-billed toucan is mainly black with a yellow neck and chest. Molting occurs once per year. It has blue feet and red feathers at the tip of its tail. The bill is mainly green with a red tip and orange sides.

Keel-billed toucans have zygodactyl feet (or feet with toes 2 and 3 facing forwards, and toes 1 and 4 facing backwards) – two toes face forward and two face back. Because toucans spend a large portion of time in the trees, this helps the birds to stay on the branches of the trees and jump from one branch to another.

Distribution and habitat
The keel-billed toucan can be found from Southern Mexico to Venezuela and Colombia. It roosts in holes in trees, often with several other toucans. This can be very cramped, so the birds tuck their tails and beaks under their bodies to keep their body temperature at a normal level while sleeping. Adding to the lack of space, the bottoms of the holes are often covered with pits from the fruit the toucans have eaten.

Behaviour and ecology
Like many toucans, keel-billed toucans are very social birds, rarely seen alone. They fly in small flocks of approximately six to twelve individuals through lowland rainforests. Their flight is slow and undulating, consisting of rapid wing beats (six to ten), then a glide with the bird's beak extending forward and dipping downward as though pulling the rest of the bird. Their feet are drawn up forward in flight. The flight distances are typically short. They live together in groups, often sharing cramped living quarters of holes in trees. There is a family structure within the group. Birds often "duel" with each other using their bills, and throw fruit into each other's mouths. They 'play ball', one throwing a fruit in the air and a second seizing it.

Breeding
The female keel-billed toucan will lay 1–4 white eggs in a natural or already-made tree cavity. The male and female share in the caring of the eggs, both taking turns incubating. The eggs hatch approximately 15–20 days after being laid. After hatching, the male and female again take turns feeding the chicks. When the chicks hatch, they have no feathers, and have their eyes closed for approximately 3 weeks. The chicks have adequately formed heel pads, which assist on the pit-covered bottom of the nest. The chicks stay in their nest for approximately eight to nine weeks while their bills develop fully and they are ready to fledge from the nest.

Food and feeding
The diet of keel-billed toucans consists mostly of a wide range of fruit, but may also include insects, eggs, nestlings and lizards. The bill, surprisingly dexterous, allows this toucan to utilize a large variety of fruit that might not otherwise be reached. When eating the fruit, it uses its bill to dissect the fruit, and then tosses its head back to swallow the fruit whole.

Aviculture
The keel-billed toucan is sometimes kept in captivity, but it requires a high-fruit diet and is sensitive to hemochromatosis (an iron storage disease).

Status
This species is threatened by habitat loss, which has been accelerating in recent years, and by hunting and trapping for the pet trade. The species is undergoing a moderately rapid population decline and is therefore evaluated as Near Threatened.

They are threatened by hunting for their meat and beaks, and toucan populations are on a decreasing trend.

References

External links

 
 Keel-billed toucan Stamps (7 countries) at bird-stamps.org
 
 Bibliography of online ornithological articles which explore the natural history of the Rainbow or Keel-billed toucan, Ramphastos sulfuratus sulfuratus.
 
 
 

keel-billed toucan
Birds of Central America
Birds of Mexico
Birds of the Yucatán Peninsula
Birds of Belize
Birds of Guatemala
Birds of Nicaragua
Birds of Costa Rica
Birds of Panama
Birds of Colombia
National symbols of Belize
keel-billed toucan
Taxa named by René Lesson